Jim Leishman MBE (born 15 November 1953) is a Scottish Labour Party politician and former professional footballer who is currently Provost of Fife and an honorary director of Scottish Championship side Dunfermline Athletic.

Career

Player
Leishman played for Dunfermline between 1970 and 1977 before being transferred to local rivals Cowdenbeath. When his playing career was cut short through injury he moved into coaching and then management with Kelty Hearts Junior Football Club, before becoming youth team coach and later reserve team coach at Dunfermline.

His most noticeable goal came in a 4-3 victory against Rangers. Jim still holds the record of being the last player to score a winning goal for the Pars at Ibrox. He likes to mention this fact as often as possible, much to the amusement of fans and friends.

Manager
Leishman was appointed manager of the Pars, aged just 28, in 1982. The club were bottom of the Second Division, the third tier of Scottish football. The Pars finished third in 1984–85, missing out on promotion on the final day of the season. Leishman and assistant manager Gregor Abel then forged a side that would win successive promotions to the Scottish Premier Division, winning the Second Division in 1985–86 and finishing second to Greenock Morton in the 1986–87 First Division.

After a hard-fought but ultimately unsuccessful campaign in the Premier Division in 1987/88, Leishman again led the club again to promotion from the First to Premier Division in the 1988/89 season. Throughout this time, Leishman had helped rebuild the fanbase of the club. With publicity campaigns ranging from talks at local primary schools to national television appearances, Leishman arrested the downward spiral of the club since the early 1970s. The average gate of the club increased from approximately 1,500 in 1983/84 to 7,500 in season 1987/88.

In 1989/90, Leishman's final year of his first tenure as the Pars' boss - the average home gate of Dunfermline Athletic Football Club was 13,500; the third largest in Scotland and the largest of all provincial clubs in the country. In this time, he brought players such as George O'Boyle and record-signing Istvan Kozma to the club. His greatest success was keeping the club in the Premier Division at the end of the season. At the end of the campaign though, it was suggested that Leishman move from the dugout to the board-room with the club's suggestion that he take up the role of general manager. As a keen manager, he resisted the offer and left his post acrimoniously in July 1990. The move shocked the Pars' support and 4,000 fans marched on the club demanding his reinstatement as manager.

Following his departure from the Pars in 1990, he had unproductive spells with Montrose and Inverness Thistle, as well as a spell in charge of Fife Junior outfit Rosyth Recreation. After this, he enjoyed more than eight years with Livingston from 1995, latterly as coach. There he succeeded in taking Livi into the Scottish Premier League for the first time and the Europe by finishing 3rd following promotion. In August 2003, he returned to Dunfermline, ironically as general manager. Following the sacking of Davie Hay with just three matches of the 2004–05 remaining, Leishman prevented relegation by steering the club to crucial wins over their main relegation rivals Dundee and Dundee United. Dunfermline had failed to win in their previous ten matches under Hay, but in Leishman's temporary care they hammered Dundee 5-0 and he soon took the job on a full-time basis.

In 2005–06, the Pars were once again tipped for relegation and almost lived up to that billing. They would have gone down, had it not been for his old club Livingston. An 11th-placed finish, although level on points with Falkirk and Dundee United, was enough to preserve their status. A particular low in this season came near the end of February when Celtic visited East End Park and left with a crushing 8-1 win. Exactly one month later, Dunfermline faced Celtic in the 2006 Scottish League Cup Final and despite an improved performance, they lost 3-0.

Leishman is well known for his down to earth personality, excellent relationship with Dunfermline fans, and his "aeroplane" celebrations. At one point, he enjoyed a reputation for his witty attempts at delivering his thoughts on football in verse. Leishman's strengths are considered to be his man-management skills and his renowned ability to motivate and install self-belief in his players.

In September 2006, another trademark of the man, his famous moustache, which he had had since the age of eighteen, was shaved off at a benefit dinner to mark the testimonial year of Dunfermline player Andy Tod. He was convinced to do so after people at the table he was sitting at, including current Pars players, put up £1000 for charity.

Pressure on Leishman increased steadily in 2006/07 after another poor start which brought just three wins in two months. On 26 October 2006, Leishman decided to return to his post as general manager, with former Hearts boss Craig Levein the initial favourite to take over. Leishman had himself recommended Levein and Livingston manager John Robertson as candidates but Levein moved to Dundee United following the sacking of Craig Brewster on 29 October 2006. Former Derry City boss, Stephen Kenny, took over in November 2006.

Politician
After retiring from football, Leishman took up politics. He was elected as a Scottish Labour councillor for the Dunfermline Central ward of Fife Council at the 2012 election, and was subsequently appointed Provost of Fife.

Personal life
In the 2007 Birthday Honours, Leishman was appointed as a Member of the Order of the British Empire (MBE) "for services to sport." Leishman was further honoured in February 2008 by having a street in Dunfermline named after him.

Honours
Dunfermline
Scottish Second Division
Winners (1): 1985–86
Scottish First Division
Winners (1): 1988–89

Livingston
Scottish First Division
Winners (1): 2000–01
Scottish Third Division
Winners (1): 1995–96
SPL Manager of the Month (2): September 2001, November 2001

Personal honours 
Jim was awarded a Great Scot Award in 2010, and in the same year, was given a Lifetime Achievement award from Radio Forth.

Again, in 2010, he received a fellow of the college award from Carnegie College at Dunfermline Abbey.

In 2012, Jim was elected as a councillor on the Friday, then was made The Provost of Fife the following Thursday.

Managerial statistics 

 Leishman's second spell at Livingston was as co-manager alongside David Hay.

Notes

External links
 

1953 births
Living people
People from Lochgelly
Scottish footballers
Dunfermline Athletic F.C. players
Cowdenbeath F.C. players
Scottish Football League players
Scottish football managers
Dunfermline Athletic F.C. managers
Livingston F.C. managers
Montrose F.C. managers
Members of the Order of the British Empire
Scottish Premier League managers
Livingston F.C. non-playing staff
Dunfermline Athletic F.C. non-playing staff
Scottish Labour councillors
Scottish Football League managers
Association football defenders
Kelty Hearts F.C. managers